This is a list of diplomatic missions in Tuvalu. At present, the capital of Funafuti hosts two diplomatic missions.

Missions in Funafuti
 – High Commission (2019).
 – Embassy

Non-resident high commissions and embassies
Resident in Canberra, Australia:

 
 

 

 
 
 

 

Resident in Suva, Fiji:

 

 
 

 
 
 

Resident in Wellington, New Zealand:

 
 
 
 
 

Resident in other locations:

 (Kuala Lumpur)
 (Tokyo)
 (New York City)
 (Jerusalem)
 (Tokyo)
 (Tokyo)

See also

 Foreign relations of Tuvalu
 List of diplomatic missions of Tuvalu

Websites
Tuvalu Online
Tuvalu Official Tourism Site

References

Foreign relations of Tuvalu
Tuvalu
Diplomatic missions
Diplomatic missions